Wenonah is a small village in Montgomery County, Illinois, United States. The population was 44 at the 2000 census.

Geography

Demographics

As of the census of 2000, there were 44 people, 16 households, and 12 families residing in the village. There were 17 housing units at an average density of 11.3 per square mile (4.3/km). The racial makeup of the village was 100.00% White.

There were 16 households, out of which 37.5% had children under the age of 18 living with them, 68.8% were married couples living together, and 25.0% were non-families. 25.0% of all households were made up of individuals, and 12.5% had someone living alone who was 65 years of age or older. The average household size was 2.75 and the average family size was 3.25.

In the village, the population was spread out, with 27.3% under the age of 18, 9.1% from 18 to 24, 20.5% from 25 to 44, 27.3% from 45 to 64, and 15.9% who were 65 years of age or older. The median age was 41 years. For every 100 females, there were 63.0 males. For every 100 females age 18 and over, there were 88.2 males.

The median income for a household in the village was $34,375, and the median income for a family was $46,250. Males had a median income of $45,417 versus $20,625 for females. The per capita income for the village was $19,890. None of the population and none of the families were below the poverty line.

References

External links
Wenonah Illinois, Historical Society of Montgomery County Illinois

Villages in Montgomery County, Illinois
Villages in Illinois